Systematics and Biodiversity is a peer-reviewed scientific journal covering all aspects of whole-organism biology. It is published by Taylor & Francis on behalf of The Natural History Museum.

Abstracting and indexing
The journal is abstracted or indexed in:
Science Citation Index Expanded
Scopus
EBSCO databases
ProQuest databases

According to the Journal Citation Reports, the journal has a 2021 impact factor of 2.313.

References

External links

English-language journals
Publications with year of establishment missing
Taylor & Francis academic journals
Systematics journals